Mayhem to Madness is the sixth studio album by Australian country band, the McClymonts, released in Australia on 12 June 2020. The album peaked at number 3 on the ARIA Albums Chart. 9 of the 10 tracks were co-written by Brooke, Sam and Mollie McClymont, with the exception of the Fleetwood Mac's song, "Little Lies".

At the 2021 Country Music Association of Australia awards, the album won Contemporary Country Album of the Year.

Reception
Tyler Jenke from ToneDeaf said "Between songs which sound like they've got the potential to top the US country charts, and introspective displays of professional songwriting, The McClymonts have truly outdone themselves with their latest record", while Zadie Collins from ToneDeaf said "Featuring some of the strongest songs of their career, mixed in with some of their most powerful and precise performances to date, Mayhem to Madness is already on track to be regarded one of the genre's finest in recent memory" calling it "possibly one of the best Australian country albums of the year."

Track listing
 "Part Time Phase" - 3:13
 "I Got This" - 3:11
 "Free Fall" - 3:18
 "Looking for Perfect" - 4:31
 "Open Heart" - 2:50
 "Lighthouse Home" - 3:11
 "Little Lies" - 3:38
 "Good Advice" - 3:24
 "Wish You Hell" - 3:36
 "Backfired" - 3:14

Charts

Weekly charts

Year-end charts

References

2020 albums
The McClymonts albums